Let It Rain is the seventh studio album by Montell Jordan. It was released by Native Records on October 21, 2008 in the United States. The first single and music video from the album is "Not No More" featuring Cignature. The video was released on September 23, 2008 through a live vlog-cast hosted by Montell Jordan himself and followed by the release of the video exclusively on YouTube. Let It Rain peaked at # 67 on the Top R&B/Hip-Hop Albums, while the single, "Me and U" made it to #71 on the Hot R&B/Hip-Hop Singles & Tracks. It was his last  before he went on to become a minister.

Track listing
Let It Rain
Left Alone (feat. Doug E. Fresh)
Can't Live Without You
Me and U
Stay With Me
I Like (The Way)
I Need A Girl
Not No More (feat. Cignature)
I Cried
Your Love (Crazy 4 You)
Comatose (Intro)
Comatose
This Is How We Roll

Charts

References

2008 albums
Montell Jordan albums